Nikki Wallace (born 30 July 1994) is an Australian rules footballer who last played for the Brisbane Lions in the AFL Women's.

Early life
Wallace was born in 1994 in Berwick, Victoria. Her family moved to the Coffs Harbour region of NSW and she was first introduced to AFL at the Sawtell Toormina Saints club under coach Tony Linnett. She was playing for Coolangatta Tweed Heads when she was drafted.

AFLW career
She made her debut in the Lions' inaugural game against  at Casey Fields on 5 February 2017.

Wallace was delisted by Brisbane at the end of the 2017 season.
After spending 2018 to 2020 at VFLW club Williamstown Wallace played for Waratah NTFL club for part of season 2020/2021. Wallace continued her VFLW career in 2021 at the North Melbourne Football Club, and was named the captain.

The Best and Fairest Medal for the AFL North Coast Youth Girls age group is named the Nikki Wallace medal in recognition of Nikki being the first player from the region to play AFLW.

References

External links

1994 births
Living people
Australian rules footballers from Melbourne
Sportswomen from Victoria (Australia)
Brisbane Lions (AFLW) players
People from Berwick, Victoria
People from Coffs Harbour
Sportswomen from New South Wales
Australian rules footballers from New South Wales